The 1888 United States presidential election in Maryland took place on November 6, 1888, as part of the 1888 United States presidential election. Voters chose eight representatives, or electors to the Electoral College, who voted for president and vice president.

Maryland voted for the Democratic nominee, incumbent President Grover Cleveland, over the Republican nominee, Benjamin Harrison. Cleveland won the state by a narrow margin of 2.94%.

Results

Results by county

Counties that flipped from Democratic to Republican
Anne Arundel
Caroline
Talbot

See also
 United States presidential elections in Maryland
 1888 United States presidential election
 1888 United States elections

Notes

References 

Maryland
1888
Presidential